{{DISPLAYTITLE:Vitamin A2}}

Vitamin A2 is a subcategory of vitamin A.

Dehydroretinal (3,4-dehydroretinal) belongs to the group of vitamin A2 as a retinaldehyde form, besides the endogenous 3,4-dehydroretinol (vitamin A2 alcohol), and 3,4-dehydroretinoic acid (vitamin A2 acid).

Vitamin A2 was first identified by Richard Alan Morton using newly-developed absorption spectroscopy in 1941.

References

Vitamins
Carotenoids